LMS diesel shunter 7052 was an experimental 0-6-0 diesel-mechanical shunting locomotive, introduced by the London Midland and Scottish Railway (LMSR) in 1934 and which remained in service with that railway for six years. It was later acquired for military use until 1966.

History
No. 7052 locomotive was an experimental locomotive built by the Hunslet Engine Company at their Leeds works in 1934. It carried an original number of 7402 only within the works and was delivered as LMSR as number 7052. For six years it was used for shunting at Leeds before being loaned to the Air Ministry in 1940. It was loaned to the War Department between 1940 and 1942, which numbered it 24. It was withdrawn from LMS stock in December 1943 and sold for use at RNAD Broughton Moor, near Maryport, for which use it was flameproofed by Hunslet. After withdrawal in 1966, it was sold to a scrap metal company in Long Marston, which used it as a yard shunter for a further three years, after which it was scrapped.

Footnotes

References

7052
Diesel shunter
War Department locomotives
Hunslet locomotives
C locomotives
Railway locomotives introduced in 1934
Standard gauge locomotives of Great Britain
Scrapped locomotives